Harland Gunn (born August 30, 1989) is a former American football offensive guard in the National Football League for the New Orleans Saints and Atlanta Falcons. He was signed by the Dallas Cowboys as an undrafted free agent in 2012. He played college football at the University of Miami.

Early years
Gunn attended Omaha Central High School. As a senior, he received All-state honors at offensive tackle. 

He accepted a football scholarship from the University of Miami. He started 30 out of 38 career games at both guard positions. As a redshirt freshman, he only played in the season opener against Charleston Southern University.

As a sophomore, he started 5 out of 13 games at right guard. As a junior, he started all 13 games at right guard.

As a senior, he started all 12 games at left guard, while not allowing a sack nor committing a single penalty.

Professional career

Dallas Cowboys
Gunn was signed as an undrafted free agent by the Dallas Cowboys after the 2012 NFL Draft on April 29. He was waived on August 31.

New Orleans Saints
On September 2, 2012, Gunn was signed to the New Orleans Saints practice squad.

Atlanta Falcons
On November 20, 2012, Gunn was signed by the Atlanta Falcons from the Saints practice squad. He was declared inactive for the final 6 games of the season. In 2013, he appeared in 3 games and was declared inactive in 13.

On August 30, 2014, he was released and signed to the practice squad the next day. On September 30, he was promoted to the active roster. He appeared in 10 games with one start. He was released on August 1, 2015.

New England Patriots
On August 2, 2015, Gunn was claimed on waivers by the New England Patriots. On August 6, he was released to make room for offensive guard Mark Asper.

Indianapolis Colts
On August 21, 2015, Gunn was signed by the Indianapolis Colts. He was released On August 31.

References

External links
Miami Hurricanes bio

1989 births
Living people
American football offensive guards
Players of American football from Nebraska
Miami Hurricanes football players
Dallas Cowboys players
New Orleans Saints players
Atlanta Falcons players
New England Patriots players
Indianapolis Colts players
Omaha Central High School alumni